Wolverton is a village in the Stratford-on-Avon District of Warwickshire, England. The population at the 2011 census was 212.

Heritage
Roman artefacts were found in the north-east of the parish and to the east of the present-day houses. Saxon artefacts have also appeared. The village was recorded in the Domesday Book of 1086 as Ulwarditone, having two estates or manors. It was known as Wolverdington until the middle of the 19th century. The parish church is dedicated to St Mary the Virgin, its oldest part dating from the 13th century, with additions made in the 14th, 16th and 19th centuries. It is accessible only by a path, as it is set back from the road. The church is a Grade II* listed building Some window glass in the west and north-west of the church dates from the 13th century. The so-called "Doom" glass at the top of the east window is from the 14th century. The Old Rectory in Main Street is a 17th-century building enlarged in the mid-19th century. Part of it is timber framed with painted brick infill. It qualifies as a Grade II listed building, as do five other residential buildings and a telephone box in the village.

Naval chaplain
Wolverton was the birthplace on 18 March 1621 of the Church of England cleric Henry Teonge, whose father was Rector in 1619–1662. Henry Teonge kept observant diaries of two Mediterranean voyages he made as a naval chaplain in 1675–1676 and 1678–1679.

Amenities
Wolverton Primary School, in Wolverton Fields, dates from 1876. The village shares a cricket club based in the nearby village of Norton Lindsey. The village is served by twice-weekly Flexibus services to Stratford upon Avon. The nearest railway station is at Claverdon railway station (1.5 miles) away.

References

External links

Villages in Warwickshire
Stratford-on-Avon District